In mathematics, the Hilbert–Burch theorem describes the structure of some free resolutions of a quotient of a local or graded ring in the case that the quotient has projective dimension 2.  proved a version of this theorem for polynomial rings, and  proved a more general version. Several other authors later rediscovered and published variations of this theorem.  gives a statement and proof.

Statement
If R is a local ring with an ideal I and 
 
is a free resolution of the R-module R/I, then m = n – 1 and the ideal I is aJ where a is a regular element of R and J, a depth-2 ideal, is the first Fitting ideal  of I, i.e., the ideal generated by the determinants of the minors of size m of the matrix of f.

References

Commutative algebra
Theorems in algebra